Penicillium johnkrugii is a species of the genus of Penicillium.

References

johnkrugii
Fungi described in 2011